The Ferrari Vision Gran Turismo is a high-performance concept car designed by Flavio Manzoni. Part of the Vision Gran Turismo series of concept cars by various manufacturers, it is a playable car in the Sony Interactive Entertainment video game Gran Turismo 7. A physical, non-functioning full-scale model of the car will also be available in a temporary display at the Museo Ferrari. Ferrari have said that the Vision Gran Turismo "represents a futuristic design manifesto for Ferrari's road and racing cars".

Specifications
The Vision Gran Turismo features the V6 engine recently developed for the 499P Le Mans Hypercar, however, is now derestricted to produce  @ 9,000 rpm and  @ 5,500 rpm. The internal combustion engine's power is delivered to the rear wheels via an 8-speed dual clutch transmission which Ferrari says has been adapted from their Formula One program.

Entry into the single seat is via the windscreen which also acts as a door, similar to the Lamborghini Egoista. The car also features various aerodynamic features such as a patented design which channels incoming air around the cockpit to the side of the car. The rear wing and diffuser also take inspiration from the 499P, along with design elements from the Ferrari Modulo concept and Ferrari 330 P3. Ferrari claims that the concept will lap the Fiorano Circuit (Ferrari's test circuit) in under 1 minute and 10 seconds, almost ten seconds faster than Ferrari's current flagship road car, the SF90.

References

Ferrari concept vehicles
Cars introduced in 2022
Gran Turismo (series)